Jawaharlal Nehru Institute of Arts & Science (JNIAS) is a private, unaided arts and science college located near the villages Balagram and Thookkupalam in Idukki district, Kerala, India. Established in 2015, the college is affiliated to Mahatma Gandhi University, Kerala and managed by People Educational & Welfare Trust. It offers courses in science and humanities at the undergraduate level.

References

External links
 

Colleges affiliated to Mahatma Gandhi University, Kerala
Private universities and colleges
Arts colleges in India
Arts and Science colleges in Kerala
Universities and colleges in Idukki district
Educational institutions established in 2015
2015 establishments in Kerala